Nguyễn Phi Hùng (born 24 June 1977), is a Vietnamese singer and actor. Known for those songs: Dáng Em, Anh Không Muốn Ra Đi (trans. I Didn't Intend To Go, a cover of Wakin Chau's version), Mưa Tuyệt Vọng, and many others Vietnam traditional folk songs. In movies, he also appears in When Men Get Pregnant (Khi Đàn Ông Có Bầu), a 2004 Vietnamese film, and won a Golden Kite Prize for his role in Seagulls (Hải Âu).

Discography

Songs
 Dáng Em
 Anh Không Muốn Ra Đi (I Didn't Intend To Go)
 Mưa Tuyệt Vọng
 Nhớ Gấp Ngàn Lần Hơn
 Tình Đơn Côi
 Sẽ Không Phải Chia Đôi ("Chiếc Giường Chia Đôi" – OST)

Filmography
 Seagulls (Hải Âu)
 When Men Get Pregnant (Khi Đàn Ông Có Bầu) (2004)
 Xin Lỗi Tình Yêu (TV Mini-Series) (2006)
 Chiếc Giường Chia Đôi (TV Mini-Series) (2011)
 Mặt Nạ Máu (2016)

Awards

References

External links

Living people
21st-century Vietnamese male singers
1977 births
People from Ho Chi Minh City
Vietnamese male actors
Vietnamese pop singers